Samantha Clarissa "Sammi" Sanchez (born January 28, 1998) is an American Latin pop singer.

Early life 
Sanchez was born in San Diego, California, the daughter of Mexican-Americans Lissa and Carlos Sanchez. She has a younger sister, Alecssa Sanchez. At the age of 11, Sanchez's family moved from Las Vegas, Nevada to New York City, New York.  She attended Professional Performing Arts School in Manhattan.

Career 
On May 4, 2015, Sanchez released her single "Talk", which she co-wrote with Matthew Tishler and Maria Christensen.

Discography

Singles

Touring

Opening Act 
 Matt Hunter - Chile (2013)
 Megan Nicole - Sweet Dreams Tour(2015)

Headling 
 Tuckahoe Music Festival (2015)

References

External 
 

Living people
1998 births
American musicians of Mexican descent
Hispanic and Latino American musicians
Musicians from California
Downtown Records artists
Hispanic and Latino American women singers
21st-century American women